Atabəy (also, Atabek and Atabey) is a village and municipality in the Shamkir Rayon of Azerbaijan.  It has a population of 654.

References 

Populated places in Shamkir District